The Tositsa Baron Museum of Metsovo, also known as the Tositsa Museum is a folk art museum in Metsovo, Ioannina, Greece.

External links
www.epcon.gr
Municipality of Metsovo (video)
www.about-ioannina.gr 
www.astoriatravel.gr

Folk art museums and galleries in Greece
Museums in Ioannina (regional unit)